Victor James Kelly (born 18 February 1971) is an Irish-American singer, musician, and composer. He is best known as a member of the award-winning pop and folk-music band The Kelly Family, which has sold more than 20 million albums since the mid-1990s. In 2005, Kelly released his debut solo album Babylon.

Biography

Music career with the Kelly Family 

Jimmy Kelly was born in Gamonal, Spain, the seventh child of teacher Daniel Jerome Kelly and the third child of dancer Barbara Ann. He has seven siblings and four half-siblings. From early childhood Jimmy Kelly travelled with his family through Europe and the US as a street musician. He has written a number of songs for the band, including "Cover the Road", "Nanana", "What's The Matter You People", "So Many Troubles", and "Blood".

Discography

Studio albums 
 2005: Babylon
 2008: Roots
 2009: Roots – Diggin' Deeper
 2010: The Hometown Sessions
 2013: Viva la Street
 2014: Live in Concert
 2015: On the Street

DVDs 
 2014: Live in Concert – At Wilhelma Theatre in Stuttgart & Heimathafen in Berlin

External links 
 
 Official Website

References 

1971 births
21st-century American singers
21st-century Irish singers
21st-century American male singers
American composers
American folk singers
American male pop singers
American people of Spanish descent
Irish composers
Irish folk singers
Irish people of American descent
Irish people of Spanish descent
Irish pop singers
Living people
People from Toledo, Spain